Atli Guðnason (born 28 September 1984) is a former Icelandic footballer who played as a winger or a striker.

Club career
He made his first team debut for FH in 2004, establishing himself in the side in the 2006 season after spending some time on loan in Iceland's second highest division. He was part of the league-winning sides of 2006, 2008 and 2009, scoring 10 goals in 20 games in the 2009 season, making him the fifth-highest scoring player that season. In addition he won the national cup with FH in 2007 and 2010, so that he won a trophy in his first five full seasons with FH, in addition playing a single league game when the club won the league for the first time in 2004.

In 2012 Atli played well and finished as the top scorer in the Icelandic league, with 12 goals, also topping the assist charts with 13 assists. Atli won his fourth league title with FH that season with three games still to go.

International career

After a good 2009 season Atli was selected for three international friendlies in the Icelandic off-season, playing the first half in a 1–0 loss to Iran in November 2009 and coming on as a late substitute in a 2–0 victory against the Faroe Islands and a 0–0 draw against Mexico in March 2010. In the March games Iceland featured mostly players playing in Iceland, with players in Europe unavailable. Atli had not appeared for the youth teams of Iceland, so these were his first international games.

Career statistics

Honours

Club
FH
Icelandic Premier Division: 2006, 2008, 2009, 2012
Icelandic Cup: 2007, 2010
Icelandic League Cup: 2004, 2006, 2007, 2009, 2014
Icelandic Super Cup: 2009, 2011

References

External links
 
 Profile on KSÍ's website

1984 births
Living people
Atli Gudnason
Atli Gudnason
Atli Gudnason
Atli Gudnason
Atli Gudnason
Association football forwards